The 2011 ITF Men's Circuit is the 2011 edition of the third tier tour for men's professional tennis. It is organised by the International Tennis Federation and is a tier below the ATP Challenger Tour. The ITF Men's Circuit consists of 534 'Futures' tournaments played year round around the world.

Schedule

January–March

April–June

July–September

October–December

Statistical information

These tables present the number of singles (S) and doubles (D) titles won by each player and each nation during the season, within all the tournament categories of the 2011 ITF Futures tournaments. The players/nations are sorted by: 1) total number of titles (a doubles title won by two players representing the same nation counts as only one win for the nation); 2) a singles > doubles hierarchy; 3) alphabetical order (by family names for players).

To avoid confusion and double counting, these tables should be updated only after an event is completed.

Last updated on: 4 October 2011 (UTC).

Titles won by player

Titles won by nation

Point distribution
Points are awarded as follows:

References

External links
International Tennis Federation official website
ITF Futures tournaments
ITF Futures results archive

 
2011
ITF Men's Circuit